Manuel de la Pezuela y Ceballos, 2nd Marquess of Viluma (8 January 1797, in A Coruña – 20 October 1872, in Madrid) was a Spanish noble and politician who served as Minister of State in 1844. He was son of Joaquín de la Pezuela, 1st Marquess of Viluma, viceroy of Peru, and of Ángela de Ceballos y Olarria.

References
Order of Calatrava. Manuel de la Pezuela

|-

Marquesses of Spain
Foreign ministers of Spain
Knights of Calatrava
1797 births
1872 deaths
Moderate Party (Spain) politicians
19th-century Spanish politicians
Leaders of political parties in Spain
Presidents of the Senate of Spain
Ambassadors of Spain to the United Kingdom of Great Britain and Ireland